Elf is a 2003 American Christmas comedy film directed by Jon Favreau and written by David Berenbaum. It stars Will Ferrell as Buddy, a human raised by Santa's elves, who learns about his origins and heads to New York City to meet his biological father. James Caan, Zooey Deschanel, Mary Steenburgen, Edward Asner, and Bob Newhart appear in supporting roles.

Elf was released in the United States on November 7, 2003, and became a major critical and commercial success, grossing $220 million worldwide against a $33 million budget. Ferrell's performance as Buddy the Elf was praised by critics and audiences alike, with many calling it one of his best performances. The film inspired the 2010 Broadway musical Elf: The Musical and NBC's 2014 stop motion animated television special Elf: Buddy's Musical Christmas. It has been hailed by many as a modern classic, and is often listed among the greatest Christmas films of all time.

Plot

On Christmas Eve, an orphaned baby crawls into Santa Claus's sack at the sight of a teddy bear, and is unknowingly taken back to the North Pole from an orphanage. After the infant is discovered at the workshop, the elves name him Buddy after his diaper's brand label. 

Buddy is accepted by the elf community and grows up to adulthood thinking he is an elf, but soon overhears he is a human. Papa Elf explains to him that he was born to Walter Hobbs and Susan Wells. She died shortly after giving him away for adoption without ever having told Walter about the pregnancy. Walter now is a children's book publisher at the Empire State Building in NYC. Santa reveals that Walter is on the Naughty List due to his selfishness, but suggests Buddy could help redeem him with some Christmas spirit.

Buddy travels to New York and finds Walter at work, but Walter mistakes him for a Christmas-gram messenger and has him ejected. Buddy heads to a local Gimbels department store that Walter’s security guards sarcastically tell him to go to, where he meets Jovie, an unenthusiastic employee, with whom he is instantly smitten. Hearing that Santa will be at the store the following day, Buddy redecorates the store overnight. However, discovering that the Gimbels Santa is not the genuine article, Buddy unmasks him and causes a brawl in the store that the manager breaks up.

Walter reluctantly bails Buddy out of the police station and takes him for a DNA test, confirming that Buddy is his biological son. Dr. Leonardo convinces him to take Buddy home to meet his stepmother Emily and half-brother Michael. Buddy's strange behavior unnerves Walter and Michael, but Emily insists that they take care of him until he "recovers." Michael warms up to Buddy after they defeat a gang of bullies in a snowball fight and encourages him to ask Jovie out on a date. During the date, the two fall in love.

Meanwhile, Walter's publishing company is failing after their latest book flops. Walter's boss, Fulton Greenway, expects Walter to have a new book ready by Christmas Eve. Walter and his team secure a meeting with best-selling children's author Miles Finch, but Buddy interrupts the meeting and mistakes Finch, who has dwarfism, for an elf. Buddy unintentionally insults Finch before the latter attacks him and angrily leaves the meeting, upon which Walter loses his temper and harshly disowns Buddy. Heartbroken, Buddy writes an apology note on an Etch A Sketch and leaves Walter’s apartment. 

Upon finding Finch's notebook full of ideas, Walter and his team scramble to create a book to pitch. As Walter prepares to pitch the book to Greenway, Michael arrives and informs Walter of Buddy's departure. Realizing his mistake, Walter quits his job and walks out with Michael to find Buddy. Meanwhile, Buddy sees Santa's sleigh crash in Central Park, attracting a large crowd. Santa explains that the sleigh’s engine is lost and cannot fly without it due to a shortage of Christmas spirit. 

Buddy finds the engine and reunites with Walter and Michael. Walter apologizes to Buddy for how he treated him and accepts him as his son. After Buddy takes them to meet Santa, Michael takes Santa's list and reads it in front of television news cameras gathered outside the park, proving that Santa is real. A group of Central Park Rangers who are angry at Santa for placing them for the Naughty List, chase the sleigh as Buddy tries to reattach the engine. Jovie leads the crowd and those watching on television in singing "Santa Claus Is Coming to Town," raising enough Christmas spirit to fully power the sleigh without the engine.

By the following Christmas, Buddy writes a book about his life, which becomes a bestseller and allows Walter to establish his own publishing company. Buddy also marries Jovie and brings their newborn daughter Susie to visit Papa Elf.

Cast

Live action
 Will Ferrell as Buddy Hobbs, aka "Buddy the Elf", an eccentric human who was raised by Santa's elves. 
 James Caan as Walter Hobbs, a children's book publisher and Buddy's biological father.
 Zooey Deschanel as Jovie, an unenthusiastic worker at Gimbels and Buddy's love interest.
 Mary Steenburgen as Emily Hobbs, Walter's wife, Michael's mother and Buddy's stepmother.
 Ed Asner as Santa Claus, a holiday figure who finds Buddy in his sack and gives him to Papa Elf to raise.
 Bob Newhart as Papa Elf, Buddy's adoptive father and the narrator.
 Daniel Tay as Michael Hobbs, Walter and Emily's son and Buddy's younger half-brother.
 Faizon Love as Wanda, the manager of Gimbels and Jovie's boss.
 Peter Dinklage as Miles Finch, a best-selling children's author and dwarf who attacks Buddy for (mistakenly) calling him an elf.
 Amy Sedaris as Deb, Walter Hobbs' secretary.
 Michael Lerner as Fulton Greenway, Walter Hobbs' controlling and uncaring boss and the CEO of Greenway Press.
 Andy Richter as Morris, a co-worker of Walter Hobbs.
 Kyle Gass as Eugene Dupree, a co-worker of Walter Hobbs.
 Artie Lange as the Fake Santa, a Mall Santa with whom Buddy gets into an altercation because he is not the real Santa Claus.
 Jon Favreau as Dr. Ben Leonardo, the Hobbs family's pediatrician.
 Matt Walsh as Eye Witness.
 Peter Billingsley as Ming Ming (uncredited), the head elf in Santa's workshop.
 Mark Acheson as a mailroom worker.
 Claire Lautier as Charlotte, the newscaster in Central Park
 David Paul Grove as Pom Pom, an elf on whom Buddy faints when he discovers he is a human.

Voice cast
 Leon Redbone as Leon the Snowman, a snowman who lives at the North Pole.
 Ray Harryhausen as Polar Bear Cub
 Jon Favreau as the Baby Walrus (uncredited), Mr. Narwhal (uncredited) and the Arctic Puffin (uncredited)
 Maurice LaMarche as Buddy's Burp (uncredited)
 Dallas McKennon as the Jack-in-the-Box (uncredited, archive audio)

Production

Development
David Berenbaum initially wrote the script in 1993, with Chris Farley and Jim Carrey being early candidates to play Buddy. Berenbaum's screenplay underwent uncredited rewrites by Scot Armstrong, Chris Henchy, and the writing team of Adam McKay and Will Ferrell. Garry Shandling was offered the role of Walter Hobbs but declined. Wanda Sykes was originally cast as the Gimbels manager Wanda but later dropped out. Terry Zwigoff was offered to direct the film, but he turned it down in favor of Bad Santa (2003). According to Favreau, the script was initially "much darker" and did not interest him, although he was interested in working with Ferrell's first post-SNL movie. Asked to rewrite it, a turning point came when he realized he could make Buddy's world an homage to the Rankin/Bass Christmas specials. This allowed him to conceive of a movie that could be PG rated as opposed to the original script, which he guessed would have been rated PG-13.

Filming

 Principal photography began on December 9, 2002, and wrapped on March 7, 2003. Filming took place in New York City, as well as in Vancouver and at Riverview Hospital in Coquitlam, British Columbia.

The film makes heavy use of forced perspective to exaggerate the size of Buddy compared to all the other elves. Stop motion animation was employed for certain sequences. CGI usage was kept to a minimum due to Favreau's own preference, something that he would later note he "had to fight very hard" for.

 
Zooey Deschanel singing was not in the original script, and Favreau added it when he learned she was a singer. When Buddy starts singing in the middle of Santaland at Gimbels, the lyrics were not scripted, and Will Ferrell improvised the song on the spot.

Post-production
Apart from snow, most of the computer-generated imagery (CGI) in the film was created by Rhythm & Hues Studios. Buddy's belch after drinking a two-liter bottle of Coca-Cola was dubbed by voice actor Maurice LaMarche.

Music
The soundtrack was released on New Line Records in November 2003 in the United States and in October 2005 in the United Kingdom, including its signature song "Baby, It's Cold Outside" by Deschanel and Leon Redbone, releasing it as a single. It was certified Gold by the RIAA in April 2011. Having sold 695,000 copies in the United States, it is the second-highest selling soundtrack album for a Christmas-themed film since Nielsen SoundScan started tracking music sales in 1991, behind only The Polar Express.

 "Pennies from Heaven" – Louis Prima
 "Sleigh Ride" – Ella Fitzgerald and the Frank De Vol Orchestra
 "Let It Snow! Let It Snow! Let It Snow!" – Lena Horne
 "Sleigh Ride/Santa Claus' Party" – Ferrante and Teicher/Les Baxter
 "Baby, It's Cold Outside" – Leon Redbone and Zooey Deschanel
 "Jingle Bells" – Jim Reeves
 "The Nutcracker Suite" – Brian Setzer
 "Christmas Island" – Leon Redbone
 "Santa Baby" – Eartha Kitt and the Henri René Orchestra
 "Winter Wonderland" – Ray Charles
 "Santa Claus Is Coming to Town" – Eddy Arnold
 "Nothing from Nothing" – Billy Preston

The score to the film, composed and conducted by John Debney and performed by the Hollywood Studio Symphony, was released by Varèse Sarabande.

Release

Home media

The film was released on DVD and VHS on November 16, 2004, and on Blu-ray on October 28, 2008. The film was subsequently released on 4K Blu-ray on November 1, 2022. It is also available for the PlayStation Portable with Universal Media Disc. This is one of the only two DVDs to be PG rated under the Infinifilm label.

Reception

Box office
Elf grossed $176.6 million in the United States and Canada, and $47.2 million in other territories, for a worldwide total of $223.9 million, against a production budget of $33 million.

The film opened at number two at the box office in the U.S. with $31.1 million, finishing behind The Matrix Revolutions, also in its first week. It topped the box office on its second week of release, beating out Master and Commander: The Far Side of the World and earning $26.3 million. Additionally, Elf went on to compete against another family-oriented film, Brother Bear. In the United Kingdom, it opened in second behind Love Actually. The 2018, 2019, and 2020 reissues earned $442,000, $786,000, and $2 million respectively.

Critical response
The website's critical consensus reads, "A movie full of Yuletide cheer, Elf is a spirited, good-natured family comedy, and it benefits greatly from Will Ferrell's funny and charming performance as one of Santa's biggest helpers." On Metacritic, the film has a weighted average score of 64 out of 100, based on 38 critics, indicating "generally favorable reviews". Audiences polled by CinemaScore gave the film an average grade of "A−" on an A+ to F scale.

Roger Ebert gave it three out of four stars, calling it "one of those rare Christmas comedies that has a heart, a brain and a wicked sense of humor, and it charms the socks right off the mantelpiece." Writing for Rolling Stone, Peter Travers gave the film two out of four stars, saying: "Ferrell makes the damn thing work. Even though he can't get naked or use naughty words, there's a devil of comedy in Ferrell, and he lets it out to play. Director Jon Favreau has the good sense to just stand out of his way." The Hollywood Reporter gave the film a positive review, saying: "While the words "instant holiday classic" might be pushing it, Elf  is at the very least a breezily entertaining, perfectly cast family treat." A. O. Scott of The New York Times also gave the film a positive review, saying: "Elf is a charming, silly family Christmas movie more likely to spread real joy than migraine, indigestion and sugar shock. The movie succeeds because it at once restrains its sticky, gooey good cheer and wildly overdoes it." Anna Smith of Empire magazine gave the film a three out of five stars and said: "Ferrell's man-child invites sympathy and sniggers, making this amusing despite some flimsy plotting. Sight gags and a Santa-centered story should keep the kids happy too." Plugged In gave the film a positive review, writing: "The elf-reared Buddy has a heart as big as the arctic north. Does his movie match it?"

Accolades

The film was nominated for nine awards and won two.

Won
 2004 ASCAP award – Top Box Office Films (John Debney)
 2004 Golden Trailer – Best Comedy
Nominated
 2004 Nickelodeon Kids' Choice Award – Favorite Movie
 2004 MTV Movie Award – Best Comedic Performance (Will Ferrell)
 2004 PFCS Award – Best Live Action Family Film and Best Use of Previously Published or Recorded Music
 2004 Teen Choice Award – Choice Movie Actor – Comedy (Will Ferrell) and Choice Movie – Comedy
 2005 Golden Satellite Award – Best Youth DVD

Critics' rankings
Elf is often ranked among the greatest Christmas films, and airs annually on television during the holiday season. In 2017, Fandango users rated Elf the best Christmas film of the 21st century.

 Digital Spy – #3
 Total Film – #3
 GamesRadar+ - #5
 Entertainment Weekly – #4
 San Francisco Chronicle – #4
 The Guardian – #4
 The Hollywood Reporter – #6
 Forbes – #7
 Newsday – #7
 about.com – #9
 Empire – #11
 Chicago Tribune – #17
 New York Daily News - #23

Other media

Musical

A Broadway musical based upon the film ran on Broadway during the 2010 Christmas season. It was directed by Casey Nicholaw, with music by Matthew Sklar, lyrics by Chad Beguelin, and a book by Bob Martin and Thomas Meehan.

The musical officially opened at the Al Hirschfeld Theatre on November 10, 2010, after previews from November 2, 2010. The cast included Sebastian Arcelus as Buddy, Amy Spanger as Jovie, Beth Leavel as Emily, Mark Jacoby as Walter, Matthew Gumley as Michael, Valerie Wright as Deb, Michael McCormick as Mr. Greenway, Michael Mandell as Store Manager, and George Wendt as Santa. It ran through to January 2, 2011.

Animated special

Elf: Buddy's Musical Christmas is an hour-long stop-motion animated musical television special based on the film and the musical of the same name. While Edward Asner was the only cast member from the film to reprise his role, the rest of the cast included Jim Parsons as Buddy, Mark Hamill as Walter Hobbs, Kate Micucci as Jovie, Rachael MacFarlane as Emily Hobbs, Max Charles as Michael Hobbs, and Gilbert Gottfried as Mr. Greenway. It was produced by Warner Bros. Animation and first aired on NBC on December 16, 2014. It features songs from the musical.

Video game
A video game based on the film was released on November 4, 2004 for the Game Boy Advance, developed by Human Soft and published by Crave Entertainment. The game follows the same plot as the movie; within the game, the player has to collect candies throughout each level while avoiding various objects and polar bears. The game received negative reviews by critics.

Cancelled sequel
On September 18, 2013, Mental Floss reported that Favreau was interested in making a sequel to the film, titled Elf 2: Buddy Saves Christmas. Later in December, Ferrell stated that he did not want to make a sequel. In January 2016, Favreau stated that a sequel could still happen. The next month, Ferrell reiterated that a sequel was unlikely and stated that he was generally reluctant to do sequels unless there was a story that justifies it. On September 18, 2020, Caan reaffirmed that the possibility of a sequel was unlikely stating that Ferrell and Favreau did not get along.

See also
 List of Christmas films
 Santa Claus in film

References

External links

 
 
 
 Official Warner Bros. Site

2003 films
2000s adventure comedy films
2000s Christmas comedy films
2000s Christmas films
2000s children's films
2000s fantasy comedy films
2003 comedy films
American films with live action and animation
American adventure comedy films
American children's comedy films
American Christmas comedy films
American fantasy comedy films
Children's Christmas films
Elf (franchise)
Films about elves
Films about dysfunctional families
New Line Cinema films
Films scored by John Debney
Films directed by Jon Favreau
Films set in 1973
Films set in 2003
Films set in California
Films set in Canada
Films set in department stores
Films set in New York City
Films shot in New York City
Films shot in Vancouver
Films using stop-motion animation
Santa Claus in film
Films about father–son relationships
2000s English-language films
2000s American films